This is a list of lighthouses in Chile from the Gulf of Corcovado to Darwin Channel.

Gulf of Corcovado

Moraleda Channel

Jacaf Channel

Puyuguapi Channel

Pilcomayo Channel

Seno Aysén

Errázuriz Channel

Darwin Channel

See also
List of fjords, channels, sounds and straits of Chile
List of islands of Chile

References
  List of Lights, Radio Aids and Fog Signals: The West Coast of North and South America... National Geospatial-Intelligence Agency. 2013. pp. 20–60.

NGA1820-NGA2043
NGA1820-NGA2043
Lighthouses NGA1820-NGA2043